Placement Group A of the 1998 Fed Cup Americas Zone Group II was one of six pools in the Americas Zone Group I of the 1998 Fed Cup. The three teams that placed first in the initial pools competed in a round robin competition, with the top team advancing to the World Group II Play-offs.

Paraguay vs. Colombia

Venezuela vs. Paraguay

Venezuela vs. Colombia

  advanced to the World Group II Play-offs, where they were drawn against . They lost 1–4, and were relegated down back to Group I for 1999.

See also
Fed Cup structure

References

External links
 Fed Cup website

1998 Fed Cup Americas Zone